Vučinić, Vucinic, Vucinich, or Vucenich is primarily a Montenegrin. Notable people with the surname include:

 Alexander S. Vucinich (1914–2002), American historian and professor
 Boro Vučinić (born 1954), Montenegrin Minister of Defense
 Gojko Vučinić (1970–2021), Montenegrin handballer
 Miloš Vučinić (born 1984), Serbian footballer
 Milutin Vučinić (1869–1922), Prime Minister of the Montenegrin government in exile in 1922
 Mirko Vučinić (born 1983), Montenegrin footballer
 Nenad Vučinić (born 1965), Coach of the New Zealand national basketball team
 Vladana Vučinić, Montenegrin pop singer
 Wayne S. Vucinich (1913-2005), American historian and professor

Montenegrin surnames
Serbian surnames